Miřetice may refer to places in the Czech Republic:

Miřetice (Benešov District), a municipality and village, Central Bohemian Region
Miřetice (Chrudim District), a municipality and village, Pardubice Region
Miřetice u Klášterce nad Ohří, a village and administrative part of Klášterec nad Ohří, Ústí nad Labem Region 
Miřetice, a village and administrative part of Vacov, South Bohemian Region